WEEY (93.5 FM) is a radio station licensed to serve Swanzey, New Hampshire.  The station is owned by Great Eastern Radio, LLC and serves as the Keene affiliate for WEEI-FM.

History
The WEEY license was originally allocated to Springfield, Vermont, where it signed on as WCFR-FM, the FM sister station to WCFR (1480), on January 1, 1972 It initially had an easy listening format, changing to an adult contemporary format in 1976. The station took the call letters WMKS in 1987, but in 1992 reverted to WCFR-FM.  After the station was sold to Bob and Shirley Wolf in 1998, the station ceased its independent programming in favor of simulcasting sister station WMXR (93.9).  As a simulcast of WMXR, formats included oldies, adult contemporary, and country.

Clear Channel Communications bought WCFR and WMXR in 2001, and merged the stations' country format (branded as "Bob Country") with that of its own WXXK (100.5), branded "Kixx".  That October, the station would change its call letters to WXKK to reflect the station's new simulcast partner.

By September 2004, WXKK had reverted to AC in a simulcast with WGXL (92.3); in that month, the station converted to a simulcast of WTSL (1400)'s news/talk programming as WTSM.  Clear Channel sold its stations in the Lebanon, New Hampshire market to Great Eastern Radio in January 2007, and two months later reverted WTSM to the WXXK simulcast.  By the time of the consummation of the sale to Great Eastern Radio, WTSM had gone silent.

On June 8, 2007, WTSM was granted a construction permit to change its community of license to Swanzey, New Hampshire. This allowed the station to better serve the Keene, New Hampshire, market.  As a result, when WTSM's attempt to return on January 25, 2008 was canceled by an interference complaint, the station permanently shut down the transmitting facility in Springfield, as the interference concerns would be alleviated by the relocation of the station.  When WTSM completed its move on October 5, 2008 (though it was initially announced for September 15), the station resumed operations with sports talk provided by Boston's WEEI, under the call letters WEEY.  In February 2012, WEEY replaced its nighttime simulcast of Fox Sports Radio with a simulcast of ESPN Radio, already carried in the market on WZBK; Fox Sports Radio returned to WEEY after less than one week. , WEEY airs NBC Sports Radio when not airing WEEI programming.

References

External links
 

EEY
Sports radio stations in the United States
Radio stations established in 1972
Cheshire County, New Hampshire
CBS Sports Radio stations